F Communications, also known as FCom, was a French record label based in Paris. It was founded in 1994 by Eric Morand and Laurent Garnier. It produces dance and electronic music by artists like Avril, Garnier, and Mr. Oizo amongst many others. 

In 1999, it was named "one of France's premier labels specializing in electronic music".

In 2003, the record label had a turnover of 2.4 million euros. 

The record label folded in 2008.

See also
 List of record labels

External links
Official website

References

French record labels
Record labels established in 1994
Electronic dance music record labels
Electronic music record labels